Prince Stephanoz was a Georgian prince of the royal Chosroid dynasty. He was the Prince of Kakheti from 685 to 736.

He was son of Prince Adarnase II of Iberia.

He had two sons, Prince Archil of Kakheti and Prince Mirian of Kakheti.

Stephen is mentioned in the inscriptions at Ateni Sioni Church dated 735 AD.

References

7th-century monarchs in Europe
Princes of Kakheti
7th-century births
8th-century monarchs in Asia
8th-century deaths
Chosroid dynasty